Henri Joseph Gedein Laame (31 August 1891 - 21 August 1966) was a Belgian horse rider who competed in the 1920 Summer Olympics and in the 1928 Summer Olympics. In 1920 he and his horse Biscuit won the silver medal in the team jumping competition.

Eight years later he and his horse Belga finished eighth with the Belgian team in the team dressage competition after finishing 27th in the individual dressage event.

References

External links 
 profile

1891 births
Year of death missing
Belgian male equestrians
Belgian show jumping riders
Belgian dressage riders
Olympic equestrians of Belgium
Equestrians at the 1920 Summer Olympics
Equestrians at the 1928 Summer Olympics
Olympic silver medalists for Belgium
Olympic medalists in equestrian
Medalists at the 1920 Summer Olympics
20th-century Belgian people